Llef (in English "A Cry") is a popular Welsh hymn, written by David Charles (1803-1880) (son of David Charles (1762–1834)). The tune was composed in 1890 by Griffith Hugh Jones (Welsh language name Gutyn Arfon) (1849–1919) and was written in memory of his brother Dewi.

The meter is 8-8-8-8 and it is played in the keys of D minor and E minor. English texts also commonly sung to the tune include "Bow Down Thine Ear, O Lord, and Hear", "Glorying in the Cross of Christ" and "The Day of Wrath".

The hymn was included in the soundtrack for the 1941 John Ford drama film How Green Was My Valley.

Hymn text

References

External links
 Welsh Music Information Centre
 Llef or Deus Salutis at musicanet.org - with link to the melody download

Hymn tunes
Welsh Christian hymns